Ngarangi is a village in North-West District of Botswana. It is located along the Okavango River, close to the Namibian border. The population was 948 in 2001 census.

References

North-West District (Botswana)
Villages in Botswana